Ruacodes is a monotypic moth genus of the family Noctuidae erected by George Hampson in 1908. Its only species, Ruacodes tela, was first described by John Bernhardt Smith in 1900. The species is found in the US state of Arizona.

References

Hadeninae
Monotypic moth genera